Katharine Margaret Alice Macmillan, Viscountess Macmillan of Ovenden  (née Ormsby-Gore; 4 January 1921 – 22 January 2017) was the daughter of the 4th Baron Harlech, granddaughter of the 4th Marquess of Salisbury, great-granddaughter of the 10th Marquess of Huntly and daughter-in-law of Prime Minister  Harold Macmillan, 1st Earl of Stockton.

On 22 August 1942, she married Conservative politician Maurice Macmillan, making her the daughter-in-law of fellow Conservative politician Harold Macmillan, who would serve as prime minister from 1957 to 1963.

They had five children together:
 1) Alexander Daniel Alan Macmillan, 2nd Earl of Stockton (born 1943)
 2) Joshua Edward Andrew Macmillan (1945–1965)
 3) Adam Julian Robert Macmillan (1948–2016)
 4) Rachel Mary Georgia Macmillan (1955–1987)
 5) David Maurice Benjamin Macmillan (born 1957)

She was Vice-Chairman of the Conservative Party in 1968 and was created a Dame Commander of the Order of the British Empire (DBE) in 1974. She became Viscountess Macmillan of Ovenden in February 1984 when her father-in-law, former British prime minister Harold Macmillan, accepted a peerage and was created Earl of Stockton. Her husband died the following month, so never inherited the earldom from his father.

She died on 22 January 2017.

References

Macmillan of Ovendon, Katharine Macmillan, Viscountess
Macmillan of Ovendon, Katharine Macmillan, Viscountess
Macmillan of Ovendon, Katharine Macmillan, Viscountess
Macmillan of Ovenden, Katharine Macmillan, Viscountess
Macmillan of Ovenden, Katharine Macmillan, Viscountess
Macmillan of Ovenden, Katharine Macmillan, Viscountess
Katharine